Bov can refer to:

 Bov (mythology), a king in Celtic mythology
 Bov, Bulgaria and Gara Bov, villages in Svoge municipality, Sofia Province, Bulgaria
 Bov municipality, Denmark
 Bug-out vehicle, used by survivalists to escape a calamity
 Blowoff valve, an element of modern turbocharged vehicles
 BOV (APC), a Yugoslav wheeled armoured personnel carrier
 Bolivian Mvdol (funds code), an ISO4217 registered currency code
 BOV: Broker Opinion of Value
 In scuba diving with a rebreather – bailout valve: valve to switch to breathing from an open-circuit demand valve
 Bank of Valletta, Malta